A special election was held in  on October 1, 1827 to fill a vacancy left by the resignation of Edward F. Tattnall (J) prior to the start of the 20th Congress.

Background
From 1792 until 1824, Georgia had elected its representatives at-large.  In 1826, Georgia switched, for that election only, to using districts.  In the new 1st district, Edward F. Tattnall (J) was re-elected to a 4th term, but resigned before the start of the 20th Congress.

Election results

See also
List of special elections to the United States House of Representatives

References

Georgia 1827 01
Georgia 1827 01
1827 01
Georgia 01
1827 Georgia (U.S. state) elections
United States House of Representatives 1827 01